The postal history of Monaco can be traced to the principality’s first postmark in 1704. Stampless covers are known with both manuscript and handstamp postmarks for Monaco and Fort d'Hercule (1793-1814 French occupation); as the principality was once much larger, postmarks of the communes of Menton and Roquebrune prior to their 1848 secession might also be included. Monaco used Sardinian stamps from 1851 until 1860, when by the Treaty of Turin, Sardinia ceded to France the surrounding county of Nice and relinquished its protectorate over Monaco; French stamps with Monaco or Monte-Carlo postmarks were used thereafter. Two forms of cancellation are known for the French period. With the first, the postmark is on the cover away from the stamps; an obliterator with an identifying post office number 4222, or later 2387, inside a diamond of ink dots cancelled the actual stamps. The second applied the postmark directly on the stamps, as both a date stamp and cancel. All of these postal forerunners, particularly usages of Sardinian stamps with Monaco cancels, are far more valuable than the same stamps postally used in the issuing countries.

The first Monegasque  postage stamps were issued on 1 July 1885, and featured the image of Prince Charles III of Monaco.

In 1937, the Principality responded to a growing interest from philatelists by creating a Stamp Issuing Office. The 1949 accession of Prince Rainier III led to increased importance for the principality’s philatelic issues. During his reign, the prince was personally involved in all aspects of the design and format of the principality’s philatelic issues, and he was quoted as stating that stamps were “the best ambassador of a country.”  The prince was a noted philatelist and his collection was the basis of Monaco’s Museum of Stamps and Coins.

Monaco joined the Universal Postal Union in 1955 and PostEurop in 1993. Monaco’s postage stamps, which are tied to French postal rate, continue to be popular among collectors and are considered to be a source of revenue for the principality.

See also
 La Poste Monaco
 Museum of Stamps and Coins

References

Further reading
 Boule, M. Histoire Postale de la Principauté de Monaco des Origines à 1885 = Postal History of Monaco to 1885. Monaco: Monaco-Collections, 1993 253p.
 Boule, M. Le Musée des Timbres et des Monnaies présente Les Collections de Son Altesse Sérénissime le Prince Rainier III = The Collection of SAS Prince Rainier II as shown at the Museum of Stamps and Coins. Monaco: Musée des Timbres et des Monnaies, 1997 47p.
 Chiavassa, H. The Principality As Seen Through Its Postage Stamps. Monaco: Postage Stamp Issuing Office, 1968 159p.
 Novo, A. Catalogue Spécialisé des Timbres de Monaco. Monaco: Musée du Timbre-Poste du Palais de Monaco, 1959 160p.
 Office des Emissions de Timbres-Poste. Emissions Postales de la Principaute de Monaco. Vol. 1: 1919-1972 (1972) 61p.; Vol. 2: 1973-1986 (1986) 55p.

External links
 Musée des Timbres et des Monnaies de Monaco
Office des Emissions de Timbre-Poste (English-language site)

Philately of Monaco